Blood is the fourth studio album by American rock band In This Moment. It was released on August 14, 2012, by Century Media Records. As has been the case with every In This Moment album, the record has a different sound, dropping many of the traditional metalcore elements in favor of electronic samples and further experimentation. This is the first album to feature rhythm guitarist Randy Weitzel, bassist Travis Johnson, and drummer Tom Hane.

This is the band's first album to be certified Gold by the Recording Industry Association of America (RIAA).

Background
After over a year of touring to support their third studio album, A Star-Crossed Wasteland, the band was ready to start work on their upcoming fourth record. Lead vocalist Maria Brink revealed that this album would be darker and the first time the band would be working with outside musicians. However, the band found themselves in a difficult position. Original members Blake Bunzel and Jeff Fabb left In This Moment to join American Idol finalist James Durbin's touring band. An official statement was released on their Facebook page in November announcing the departure. The statement also stated that the rest of the band members were ready to head back to the studio in the beginning of 2012 for a summer release. Guitarist Randy Weitzel was introduced during In This Moment's appearance at Shiprocked in December 2011 and drummer Tom Hane was introduced at Soundwave Festival in February 2012.

Composition
The genre of the album has been described primarily as alternative metal, nu metal, industrial metal, and metalcore, featuring elements of electronic music.

Release and promotion
Brink and Chris Howorth saw the band departures as something positive and it would heavily influence the album. Brink says, "it's meant to be that they moved on and some other things in my life, it's so cool 'cause it's just like this brand new everything and it feels really awesome. And you're going to be able to hear it." Howorth says, "Jeff and Blake leaving kind of opened us up a bit and we went from the heart. We went a different route and it was more organic than ever before." Brink and Howorth reteamed with long-time producer, Kevin Churko, at the Hideout in Las Vegas to begin process on the album. Two songs emerged from those sessions, "Blood" and "Hello" (later became "From the Ashes"), which Howorth says brought them a new management deal with In De Goot.

"Blood" made its first appearance during In This Moment's set at the Soundwave festival on February 26, 2012. Other new songs that made it onto their First Blood Tour included "Adrenalize", "Whore", "Burn", and "You're Gonna Listen". The words to the album intro, "Rise with Me" were sung by Brink over Dredg's "What Have I Done" on their 2011 tour as an intro.

On May 14, 2012, it was announced that the album would be released on August 14, 2012, and that the first single, "Blood", would be released on June 12, 2012. A stream of the studio version premiered in a Cage Match battle on WWBM on May 31, 2012. "You're Gonna Listen" was available for streaming on July 3, 2012.

The album artwork and track listing for Blood were released on June 18, 2012.

Reissue
A deluxe edition featuring a bonus disc of remixes was released on December 14, 2012. It was sold exclusively at all Hot Topic stores and was to contain the iTunes Store bonus track of Nine Inch Nails' "Closer", however the song was left off of the initial pressing. The bonus track was available as a free download to those who purchased the release. The error was corrected in later pressings. Blood was re-released on May 31, 2013 in Europe as a two-disc edition titled "Reissue & Bonus" featuring the same track listing as the Hot Topic release.

The album was reissued (this time as a special edition) for the third time on January 21, 2014. It contains the bonus track Nine Inch Nails' "Closer" and includes a DVD titled Blood at the Orpheum, which was shot on May 21, 2013 at the Orpheum Theater in Madison. This is the first live concert DVD shoot for the band. A cover of Nine Inch Nails' "Hurt" was performed at the show, however it was omitted on the release. A Blu-ray version of the release was made available exclusively at Best Buy retail stores and the audio of the concert was released digitally at the same time titled Blood at the Orpheum.

Critical reception

Chad Bowar from About.com wrote, "In This Moment is a polarizing band, and although there are a couple of marginal tracks, their fans will be pleased with Blood, which delivers all the elements they have come to expect along with some new twists. The band's accessible side will also continue to attract more radio play and attention from hard rock aficionados."

Ryan Reed from The Phoenix stated, "Blood sounds like R-rated Evanescence—a waste of such devilish talents. Elsewhere, In This Moment are up to some weird, wild, wonderful stuff."

Commercial performance
Blood debuted at number 15 on the Billboard 200, selling around 20,000 copies in its first week. This marked the band's highest-peaking album until the release of Black Widow in November 2014. As of February 12, 2014, the album had sold over 227,000 copies. On May 10, 2017, it was certified Gold by the Recording Industry Association of America (RIAA).

Track listing

Personnel
Credits adapted from the liner notes of Blood.

In This Moment
 Maria Brink – lead vocals, piano
 Chris Howorth – lead guitar, backing vocals
 Randy Weitzel – rhythm guitar
 Travis Johnson – bass
 Tom Hane – drums

Additional personnel

 Kevin Churko – production, recording, mixing, mastering
 Kane Churko – additional engineering, additional production
 Harvey Thibault – Pro Tools editing
 Nick Helbling – Pro Tools editing
 Mike McHugh – studio assistance
 Mitchell Marlow – additional programming, guitar 
 Jake E. Lee – guest guitar solo 
 Anthony Clarkson – artwork, layout
 Robert Kley – band photos

Charts

Weekly charts

Year-end charts

Certifications

References

2012 albums
Albums produced by Kevin Churko
Century Media Records albums
In This Moment albums